The 1997–98 West Virginia Mountaineers men's basketball team represented West Virginia University as a member of the Big East Conference during the 1997-98 season. The team played their home games at WVU Coliseum in Morgantown, West Virginia. Led by 20th-year head coach Gale Catlett, the Mountaineers received an at-large bid to the 1998 NCAA tournament as the No. 10 seed in the West region. West Virginia advanced to the Sweet Sixteen and finished with an overall record of 24–9 (11–7 Big East).

Roster

Schedule and results

|-
!colspan=9 style=| Regular season

|-
!colspan=9 style=| Big East Tournament

|-
!colspan=9 style=| NCAA Tournament

Rankings

References

West Virginia
West Virginia Mountaineers men's basketball seasons
West Virginia Mountaineers men's basketball
West Virginia Mountaineers men's basketball
West Virginia